Dreaming in Color is the fifth studio album by Christian pop group Jump5, released on Sparrow Records on September 21, 2004. It is the first release from the group as a quartet after the departure of Libby Hodges. Singles from the album included "Dance with Me" and "It's a Beautiful World". The album charted at #15 on Billboard's Top Christian Albums chart. I've Got the Music in Me is a cover of a song by The Kiki Dee Band from the album that has the same name of the song.

Track listing

References

2004 albums
Jump5 albums
Sparrow Records albums